Miami Bend is an unincorporated community in Miami Township, Cass County, Indiana, United States.

Geography

References

External links

Unincorporated communities in Cass County, Indiana
Unincorporated communities in Indiana